Kallimarmaro (  meaning ‘made of beautiful marble’) is a small neighborhood of Athens, Greece, named after the Panathenaic Stadium. It is located within Pangrati.

References

Neighbourhoods in Athens